Stanford Leonard Luce Jr (May 19, 1923 – March 26, 2007) was an American academician known for his work on Louis-Ferdinand Céline and for his English translations of Jules Verne books, especially The Kip Brothers and The Mighty Orinoco, which he was the first to translate into English.

Biography
Luce was born in Boston, Massachusetts, the son of Agnes Foote Luce and Stanford L. Luce Sr. He received a Ph.D. in French studies from Yale University. He died at the age of 83 in Cincinnati, Ohio.

Works
Jules Verne, moralist, writer, scientist (1953), first English Ph.D. dissertation on Jules Verne, Yale University
A Glossary of Céline's Fiction, with English Translations (1979), Quality Books, 
A Half-century of Céline: An Annotated Bibliography, 1932-1982 with William K. Buckley (1983), Garland Pub., 
Céline and His Critics: Scandals and Paradox (1986), Anma Libri, 
Celine's Pamphlets: An Overview (199*), self-published,

Translations
Jules Verne, The Mighty Orinoco, with Arthur B. Evans, Walter James Miller (2002), Wesleyan University Press, 
Jules Verne, The Begum's Millions, with Arthur B. Evans and Peter Schulman (2005), Wesleyan University Press, 
Louis-Ferdinand Céline, Conversations with Professor Y (2006), Dalkey Archive Press, 
Jules Verne, The Kip Brothers, with Arthur B. Evans and Jean-Michel Margot (2007), Wesleyan University Press,

References

American translators
French–English translators
Jules Verne
1923 births
2007 deaths
American speculative fiction translators
20th-century translators